Israel Fogel (born 2 April 1949) is a retired Israeli footballer.

Honours
Israeli Premier League (1):
1981–82
Israel State Cup (2):
1975, 1980
Israeli Second Division (1):
1985-86

References

1949 births
Living people
Israeli Jews
Israeli footballers
Hapoel Kfar Saba F.C. players
Hapoel Kiryat Ono F.C. players
Maccabi Herzliya F.C. players
Liga Leumit players
Association football forwards
Israel international footballers